Washboard may refer to:

 Washboard (laundry), a tool for washing clothes
 Washboard (musical instrument), a percussion instrument
Washboarding, corrugation on gravel or dirt roads